Troy Jutting is a former American ice hockey player and coach who was the head coach for Minnesota State for twelve seasons.

Career
Jutting arrived at Mankato State in 1982 and played for years for the program. The Mavericks were one of the better Division III teams during that time, making the NCAA tournament in three seasons and reached the frozen four in his senior year. Jutting graduated a year after his eligibility ended and began attending graduate school at his alma mater, serving concurrently as a graduate assistant for the program for two years. In 1989 Jutting became a full-time assistant for the Mavericks and remained in that position while the team moved up to Division II and finally Division I in 1996. When long-time head coach Don Brose retired after the 1999–00 season Jutting was named as his successor.

In the early years the team played well under Jutting. His teams posted two winning campaigns in the first three seasons and made the 2003 NCAA tournament but after that the results turned bad. In twelve seasons behind the bench Jutting recorded only three winning records and was among the worst programs in the WCHA for his last four years. Minnesota State reassigned him to an administrative position with a year left on his contract in the summer of 2012 but a few months later he was hired by Omaha as an assistant coach. Jutting worked for the Omaha Mavericks for four years before being fired along with the other Omaha assistant coach Alex Todd in the spring of 2016.

Head coaching record

References

External links

Year of birth missing (living people)
Living people
American men's ice hockey centers
Ice hockey coaches from Minnesota
Minnesota State Mavericks men's ice hockey coaches
Minnesota State Mavericks men's ice hockey players
People from Richfield, Minnesota
Ice hockey players from Minnesota
Minnesota State University, Mankato alumni